Raúl Martín Sandoval Zavala (born 18 January 2000) is a Mexican professional footballer who plays as a defender for Liga MX club Mazatlán.

References

External links

Living people
2000 births
Mexican footballers
Mexico youth international footballers
Association football central defenders
Club Tijuana footballers
Dorados de Sinaloa footballers
Club Necaxa footballers
Liga MX players
Ascenso MX players
Footballers from Sinaloa
People from Ahome Municipality